Lammert is a given name derived from Lambert and a surname. It may refer to:

Given name
Pieter Lammert Bon (born 1946), Dutch rower
 (born 1932), Dutch theologian and university-president
Lammert Bouke van der Meer (born 1945), Dutch classicist and classical archeologist
Lammert Swart (1847-1909),  Dutch commander of the Royal Netherlands East Indies Army

Surname
Lammert
 Mark Lammert (born 1960), German painter, illustrator, graphic artist, and stage-designer
 Norbert Lammert (born 1948), German politician of the Christian Democratic Union (CDU)
 Petra Lammert (born 1984), German shot-putter and current bobsledder
 Will Lammert (1892-1957), German sculptor
Lammerts
Johan Lammerts (born 1960), Dutch road bicycle racer

Dutch masculine given names
German-language surnames